Kohur Kalaghi (also Romanized as Kohūr Kalāghī) is a village in Takht Rural District, Takht District, Bandar Abbas County, Hormozgan Province, Iran. At the 2006 census, its population was 244, in 54 families.

References 

Populated places in Bandar Abbas County